Eight French ships of the French Navy have borne the name Belle:
 A 6-gun frigate (1668)
 A galley (1669)
 A captured Spanish frigate (1676)
 A barque (1678)
 A galley (1679)
 A barque (1684)
 A galley (1688)
 A barque (1691)

French Navy ship names